The Western Railway Museum, in Solano County, California is located on Highway 12 between Rio Vista and Suisun.  The museum is built along the former mainline of the
Sacramento Northern Railway. Their collection focuses on trolleys, as it is primarily a museum of interurban transit equipment.

The Western Railway Museum has the largest collection of Sacramento Northern Railway equipment in existence, and the museum also operates a line of the former Sacramento Northern as a heritage railway with scheduled excursions for visitors.

Originally named the California Railway Museum, it was renamed the Western Railway Museum at the beginning of 1985.  The museum is operated by the Bay Area Electric Railroad Association (BAERA), a non-profit organization.

History

The Bay Area Electric Railroad Association was started by a group of San Francisco Bay Area rail fans in 1946. The group was specifically interested in electric traction, more than main line railroads. Other groups such as the California/Nevada Historical Society usually had meetings and excursions on main line subjects. BAERA held monthly social meetings, frequently showing members slides and movies to the group. The BAERA also had excursions on the many street car lines and Interurbans in the Bay Area. As a result of an excursion over the Key System the Association purchased Key System 271 a wooden street car that had started out in Lehigh Valley, Pennsylvania. Soon other cars were given by members or purchased for the Association. These included Sacramento Northern 62, a Birney street car built in 1920. The car ran local service in Chico, California until 1947 and had the last 5-cent fare in the State of California.

A number of passenger and work cars were obtained when the Key System abandoned operation of its last rail line across the Bay Bridge in 1958. But time, money and effort needed in constantly moving the equipment from place convinced the members that a permanent location for their railway museum was needed. Property was located at Rio Vista Junction, a former station stop along the Sacramento Northern Railway near Suisun, California in 1960. BAERA became a 501(c)(3) non-profit educational corporation in the 1960s, and created as its major project the California Railway Museum.  At the beginning of 1985, the museum was renamed the Western Railway Museum, to avoid confusion with the California State Railroad Museum.  Significant events at the Western Railway Museum include: purchase of 22 miles of Sacramento Northern in 1994, dedication of a Visitors Center in 2001, and starting in 2002, construction of the Loring Jensen Memorial Car House with attendant fire suppression system, officially opened in May 2008.

The Association also publishes a newsletter called the Review.

Collection 

The BAERA maintains a substantial archive of materials relating to street railway, interurban lines, and steam railroads of California and adjacent states. The archive occupies a climate controlled space in one of the newer buildings.

The Association owns about 100 pieces of railroad equipment, mainly from the electric railroads of the West, but also several Western Pacific Railroad pieces including two steam locomotives. Equipment is in a wide range of conditions, and some equipment is maintained fully operational. For example, Petaluma and Santa Rosa 63, Peninsular Railway 52, Salt Lake and Utah 751, and Sacramento Northern 62.

The interurban car Sacramento Northern 1005 (originally Oakland, Antioch and Eastern 1005) has been a focus of restoration activity in the last 10 years. The BAERA operated many excursions in its early years, and this car was used quite frequently. It was often hauled around in freight trains to reach an excursion site, and sometimes suffered damage in these trips, including a badly bent frame in June 1962. The damage has been repaired and the car has been restored to its 1934 configuration.

The collection also includes a railroad line. This is a section of the original Sacramento Northern Railway from Montezuma (near Collinsville) north to Dozier, also a newer rail line west from Dozier to Cannon (near Vacaville). The railroad was acquired with rails and ties intact, however the electrification had been removed in 1953. The Association is reinstalling the electrification from Rio Vista Junction southward, currently reaching Bird's Landing Road, about six miles.

Passenger/Interurban cars

Streetcars/Light rail trams

Locomotives

Maintenance of Way equipment

Freight cars

The museum today

Visitors can take a  street car ride and/or a  Interurban ride, picnic at the shaded grounds, browse in the Bookstore and view small exhibits in the Visitor center. Also in the Visitor center is the Depot Cafe, and F. M. Smith Library and Archives which are open two days a month for research and browsing. Also available are self-guided car house tours and guided car house tours.

The museum is open on weekends throughout the year and for extended hours during the summer.

See also

Hall-Scott
 List of heritage railroads in California
 List of museums in California
W. L. Holman Car Company

References

External links

Official Western Railway Museum website
Forty four color photos of WRM museum collection 
Information regarding Holman Car Company of San Francisco
Petaluma & Santa Rosa, Combine no 63

Museums in Solano County, California
Heritage railroads in California
Railroad museums in California
History of Solano County, California
Culture in the San Francisco Bay Area
National Register of Historic Places in Solano County, California
Electric railways in California
1960s establishments in California
Museums established in the 1960s